Avi Avital (Hebrew: אבי אביטל, born 19 October 1978) is an Israeli mandolinist. He is best known for his renditions of well-known Baroque and folk music, much of which was originally written for other instruments. He has been nominated for a Grammy award (Best Instrumental Soloist with Ensemble) and in 2013 signed a record agreement with Deutsche Grammophon.

Early life
Avital was born in the Israeli city of Be'er Sheva and showed an aptitude for the mandolin at an early age; by the time he was eight years old, he was performing with a local orchestra. He went on to study at the Jerusalem Academy of Music and the Cesare Pollini Conservatory of Music in Padua, Italy, where the focus of his work moved from mandolin transcriptions of violin pieces to those originally written with his instrument in mind. His study in Italy was sponsored by the America-Israel Cultural Foundation.

Performance career
Avital has performed at Carnegie Hall and the Lincoln Center in New York, the National Centre for the Performing Arts and the Forbidden City Concert Hall in Beijing, and the Berlin Philharmonie, and has performed with a number of international orchestras and chamber groups. In 2011, he performed throughout Australia with the Australian Brandenburg Orchestra, and again in 2016, with performances in Sydney, Melbourne and Brisbane. In 2013, he performed on a tour with the Geneva Camerata. In addition to the Grammy nomination, he has won Israel's Aviv Competition and received Germany's ECHO Prize.

Avital's recording debut, a collection of sonatas and concertos entitled Bach, was released on June 12, 2012.

Life's work
Avital continues a tradition of virtuosic mandolin players that has brought the classical-music mandolin to public attention. Largely dormant as a group since the 1920s, talented players are again getting attention for doing new things with the mandolin, including Italians Carlo Aonzo and Mauro Squillante, Americans Chris Thile, Joseph Brent and Mike Marshall, and Israelis Avi Avital, Tom Cohen, Jacob Reuven and Alon Sariel.

Avital purposely set out to improve the mandolin's place in the world. He has done well for the instrument, playing his mandolin in Carnegie Hall and looks at that accomplishment as evidence for a renaissance for the mandolin, of its increasing prominence in classical music. He was also the first mandolinist to be signed to the label Deutsche Grammophon, in 2012. As of the fall of 2016, he added approximately 90 new mandolin pieces to the mandolin's repertoire.

Avital's path to success didn't simply involve digging into the archive of music historically played on the mandolin. That repertoire of music is relatively small. Aware  of his role in bringing the mandolin into the concert hall, he realized that adding to the "quality repertoire" of the instrument is important for its future. He also specifically targets the perception that the instrument is limited by taking on "monumental works" of  "sacred" composers such as Bach to change the outlook.

Although he makes new arrangements of classical works not intended originally for mandolin, Avital has also added new music to the classical mandolin music base.  He found as he travelled around the world that the mandolin was involved with folk music everywhere he went. He used that as a starting point to add to the mandolin's repertoire.  He began to bridge folk music aspects of the mandolin with the classical music which he was playing, including Bulgarian, Welsh, and klezmer music on his second album, "Between Worlds." Not only new to the mandolin, but some of these are also to classical music as well. He also works with other musicians in world music and jazz for inspiration.

References

1978 births
Living people
Israeli composers
Israeli mandolinists
Deutsche Grammophon artists